Etoile Independent School District was a public school district based in the community of Etoile, Texas (United States). Its territory was entirely in Nacogdoches County.

Etoile ISD had one school that serves students in grades Kindergarten through eight. Students in grades nine through twelve attended Woden High School in the Woden Independent School District.

In 2009, the school district was rated "academically acceptable" by the Texas Education Agency.

From the financial year of 2018 until 2022, the student count declined by 44%. The district also reported conflicting property value information affecting its operations, with contradictory information from the Texas State Comptroller's Office and Nacogdoches County Appraisal District. In March 2022 its student count was 97, the majority of them at the elementary level. That month Etoile announced that it would consolidate with the neighboring Woden Independent School District, with Woden being the surviving district. Woden ISD's board agreed to consolidate with Etoile, and the Texas Education Agency (TEA) stated to the Etoile ISD that the district should agree. Etoile ISD also agreed to the consolidation. The reason for the consolidation was financial issues. The consolidation was effective July 1, 2022. Etoile School closed with all operations moved to Woden.

See also 
 Non-high school district

References

External links
Etoile ISD

School districts in Nacogdoches County, Texas
2022 disestablishments in Texas
Educational institutions disestablished in 2022
Public K–8 schools in Texas